Gotham is a double-disc live album by English gothic rock band Bauhaus of a concert performed in 1998, released in 1999 by record label Metropolis. The album also includes one appended studio track, a cover of "Severance", originally recorded by Dead Can Dance on their 1988 album The Serpent's Egg.

Track listing

Personnel 

 Peter Murphy – vocals, guitar
 Daniel Ash – guitar
 David J – bass guitar
 Kevin Haskins – drums

References

External links 

 

Bauhaus (band) albums
1999 live albums
Albums recorded at the Hammerstein Ballroom